The Very World of Milton Jones was a comedy show broadcast on BBC Radio 4 between 1998 and 2001 starring English comedian Milton Jones. It ran for three series.

Each programme would begin with Jones facing certain death in some bizarre circumstance or other, such as being put before a firing squad in Mexico, or being faced with a cobra in the jungles of South America. At the moment before his death, a guardian angel would appear and freeze time, then spend the rest of the show reviewing and interpreting the events which had led up to his impending demise, as well as covering hypothetical situations that Milton could have been involved in (such as selling Watchtowers in Arthurian England). At the end of the show, the angel would leave, at which point Jones would be blessed with an incredibly narrow escape from death, usually related to jokes in the show (for example, in the "Firing Squad" episode, Milton is revealed as a supermarket worker, and he is saved from death when the bullets rebound from his Tesco clubcard), thus setting him up for the next episode.

In addition to Jones himself, various other performers frequently appeared on the show. These were Alexander Armstrong, Melanie Hudson, Dave Lamb, Alistair McGowan, Joanna Scanlan and former Week Ending comedian Sally Grace.

All three series were produced and directed by David Tyler.

The programme is often repeated on digital radio station BBC 7 / BBC Radio 4 Extra

All three series are available to download as audiobooks from Audible.com.

Episode list

References

External links

BBC Radio 4 programmes
BBC Radio comedy programmes